Griffith House or Griffiths House may refer to:

 Robert G. Griffith Sr. House, Summit, Alabama, listed on the NRHP in Alabama
 Bateman-Griffith House, Clarendon, Arkansas, listed on the NRHP in Arkansas
 Griffith House (Penryn, California), listed on the NRHP in California
 Griffiths House (Opa-Locka, Florida), listed on the NRHP in Florida
 John W. Griffiths Mansion, Chicago, Illinois, listed on the NRHP in Illinois
 Pierson-Griffiths House, Indianapolis, Indiana, listed on the NRHP in Indiana
 E. H. Gibbs House, in Oskaloosa, Iowa, also known as Griffith Hall
 Griffith-Franklin House, Calhoun, Kentucky, listed on the NRHP in Kentucky
 D. W. Griffith House, La Grange, Kentucky, listed on the NRHP in Kentucky
 Griffith House (Midway, Kentucky), listed on the NRHP in Kentucky
 Griffith House (Aberdeen, Maryland), listed on the NRHP in Maryland
 Griffith-McCune Farmstead Historic District, Eolia, Missouri, listed on the NRHP in Missouri
 James Griffith House, Canal Winchester, Ohio, listed on the NRHP in Ohio
 William R. Griffith House, Harrisburg, Pennsylvania, listed on the NRHP in Pennsylvania
 David Jefferson Griffith House, Gilbert, South Carolina, listed on the NRHP in South Carolina
 James Turk Griffith House, Ten Mile, Tennessee, listed on the NRHP in Tennessee
 Jenner-Griffiths House, Minersville, Utah, listed on the NRHP in Utah
 J. W. Griffiths House, Port Townsend, Washington, listed on the NRHP in Washington